Juan Carlos Díaz Falcon (born June 2, 1981) is a Venezuelan taekwondo practitioner. He won a silver medal for the heavyweight class at the 2011 Pan American Games in Guadalajara, Mexico, losing out to Cuba's Robelis Despaigne.

Diaz qualified for the men's heavyweight division (+80 kg) at the 2008 Summer Olympics in Beijing, after placing third from the Pan American Qualification Tournament in Cali, Colombia. He was knocked out by Morocco's Abdelkader Zrouri, at one minute and forty seconds in the second round of preliminary match, with a final score of 3–4.

References

External links

NBC 2008 Olympics profile

Venezuelan male taekwondo practitioners
1981 births
Living people
Olympic taekwondo practitioners of Venezuela
Taekwondo practitioners at the 2008 Summer Olympics
Taekwondo practitioners at the 2011 Pan American Games
Pan American Games silver medalists for Venezuela
Pan American Games medalists in taekwondo
Medalists at the 2011 Pan American Games
20th-century Venezuelan people
21st-century Venezuelan people